The 1966–67 FIBA FIBA European Champions Cup was the tenth season of the European top-tier level professional basketball club competition FIBA European Champions Cup (now called EuroLeague). The trophy was won by Real Madrid, for the third time, at their home venue Pavilion at the Sports City of Real Madrid, after they defeated Simmenthal Milano 91–83.

Competition system
25 teams. European national domestic league champions, plus the then current FIBA European Champions Cup title holders only, playing in a tournament system. The competition culminated in a Final Four.

First round

|}

*Collegians from Belfast withdrew before the first leg and Herly Amsterdam received a forfeit (2-0) in both games.

Second round

|}

*Hapoel Tel Aviv withdrew before the first leg and Lokomotiv Sofia received a forfeit (2-0) in both games.

**After a 142 aggregate drew, a third decisive game was held in which Slavia VŠ Praha won 77–61.

Quarterfinals group stage
The quarterfinals were played with a round-robin system, in which every Two Game series (TGS) constituted as one game for the record.

Final four

Semifinals
March 29, Sports City of Real Madrid Pavilion, Madrid

|}

3rd place game
April 1, Sports City of Real Madrid Pavilion, Madrid

|}

Final
April 1, Sports City of Real Madrid Pavilion, Madrid

|}

Final standings

Awards

FIBA European Champions Cup Finals Top Scorer
 Steve Chubin ( Simmenthal Milano)

References

External links
1966–67 FIBA European Champions Cup
1966–67 FIBA European Champions Cup 
1966–67 FIBA European Champions Cup
Champions Cup 1966–67 Line-ups and Stats

FIBA
1966-67